Carl Gottlieb (born March 18, 1938) is an American screenwriter, actor, comedian, and executive. He is best known for co-writing the screenplay for Jaws (1975) and its first two sequels, as well as directing the 1981 film Caveman.

Early life
Gottlieb was born to a middle class Jewish family in New York City, the son of Elizabeth, a medical administrative assistant, and Sergius M. Gottlieb, an engineer.

Gottlieb studied drama at Syracuse University where he befriended character actor Larry Hankin.  After graduating, he was drafted into the Army, serving as an entertainment specialist in the Special Services division from 1961 to 1963. Following his discharge, he became a member, later in the 1960s, of the San Francisco improvisational comedy troupe "The Committee". They made one feature film: A Session with the Committee.

Career
He began writing comedy for TV, contributing to The Smothers Brothers Comedy Hour for which he won an Emmy Award in 1969, The Music Scene,  The Bob Newhart Show, All in the Family, and The Odd Couple. He also appeared on camera on Ken Berry's Wow Show variety summer television program in 1972.  Minor acting roles have included Robert Altman's M*A*S*H and the film Clueless.

Gottlieb also cowrote David Crosby's two autobiographies, 1989's Long Time Gone and 2006's Since Then.

Jaws
Gottlieb was hired as an actor to appear as Harry Meadows, the editor of the local newspaper, in Jaws. He was hired by his friend, Steven Spielberg, to redraft the script, adding more dimensions to the characters, particularly humor. His redrafts reduced the role of Meadows (who still appears in the Town Hall corridor and the Tiger Shark scene).

He wrote a book, The Jaws Log, about the notoriously difficult production of the film. Bryan Singer has referred to it as being "like a little movie director bible".

He was enlisted under similar circumstances to work on the Jaws 2 screenplay. He co-wrote the screenplays for The Jerk, in which he played Iron Balls McGinty, and Jaws 3-D. Gottlieb contributes to Jaws related activities, such as interviews (including the documentary The Shark Is Still Working) and attended JawsFest on Martha's Vineyard in June 2005.

Writers' politics
Gottlieb joined the Writers Guild of America in 1968 and became interested in Guild politics and with a desire to serve fellow writers following writers' strikes in the 1970s and 1981. He was elected to the Board of Directors in 1983, and re-elected for numerous terms thereafter, including two stints as vice-president (1991–1994). He was again appointed VP of the Writers Guild of America, West in 2004 and served until the following year. In September 2011, he was elected as WGA-West secretary-treasurer.

Filmography

Feature films

As Writer Only

As Director Only

As actor

References

External links

 

1938 births
Living people
Male actors from New York City
American male film actors
Jewish American screenwriters
American male television actors
American male screenwriters
Primetime Emmy Award winners
Syracuse University alumni
Writers from New York City
Comedians from New York City
Screenwriters from New York (state)
21st-century American Jews